The Sutton Place Hotel was initially a 33-storey hotel and apartment building located at 955 Bay Street in Toronto, Ontario, Canada. Designed by the architectural firm Webb Zerafa Menkès Housden and operating from 1967 to 2012, Sutton Place was one of Toronto's most luxurious hotels and was known for frequently hosting dignitaries and celebrities. It was operated by the Sutton Place Hotel Company (SP), which also manages hotel properties in Halifax, Revelstoke and Vancouver (The Sutton Place).

History

The Sutton Place project was developed by Max Tanenbaum of York Steel and the lawyer David Dennis. The architectural firm Webb Zerafa Menkès Housden – the descendant of Peter Dickinson Associates – designed the building, which along with the hotel included luxury apartments on the upper floors. The top floor of the hotel, thirty-three stories high, held the restaurant "Stop 33" which featured a starlight ceiling and tall windows. Also included in the structure were two pools, a pub, a banquet hall and an office building. The lobby featured a mural painted by Shirley Tattersfield depicting Canada's history, a tribute to the country's centennial that year. At the time of its opening, Sutton Place was the tallest building in Toronto north of Queen Street.

Three months after it opened, the stock promoter Myer Rush was seriously injured by a bomb planted in the bed of the 6th-floor room where he was staying. Myer had been due in court the next morning to face charges in an alleged $100 million stock fraud.

During its time Sutton Place hosted numerous celebrities and was a major destination for actors during the annual Toronto International Film Festival. Notable guests included Pierre Trudeau, Sophia Loren, Elizabeth Taylor, Stevie Nicks and Ted Danson. In 1967, the vibraphonist Hagood Hardy recorded the album Stop 33 in the lounge of the same name, where his band had a residency.

Redevelopment
It was sold to a Hong Kong-based ownership group in 1993. It was purchased in the early 2010s by Lanterra Developments. The hotel officially closed on 15 June 2012, forty-five years after opening. All contents of the hotel were sold at auction in 2014.

In 2013, the redevelopment plan faced some opposition from most of the tenants in the 161 rental units. In late 2015, the building was gutted, several stories were added, and work began on converting the existing frame into a new condominium tower called The Britt, completed in 2019, which contains 727 residential units, 78 of which are rental units.

References

Michael McClelland and Graeme Stewart (eds), Concrete Toronto: A Guide to Concrete Architecture from the Fifties to the Seventies. Toronto: Coach House, 2007.

1967 establishments in Ontario
2012 disestablishments in Ontario
Defunct hotels in Canada